Romania sent a delegation to compete at the 2008 Paralympics in Beijing. The delegation consisted of five athletes (2 female, 3 male) competing in 3 disciplines, and six officials.

Medallists

The country won one medal, a silver, its first Paralympic medal ever.

Cycling

Road

Track

Men

Powerlifting

Tennis

See also
Romania at the Paralympics
Romania at the 2008 Summer Olympics

References

 Rompres communique at sport365.ro

External links
 Romanian National Paralympic Committee's Official website (in English)

Nations at the 2008 Summer Paralympics
2008
2008 in Romanian sport